The 2002 United States House of Representatives election in Vermont was held on Tuesday, November 5, 2002 to elect the U.S. representative from the state's at-large congressional district. The election coincided with the elections of other federal and state offices.

Democratic primary

Republican primary

Candidates
Karen Ann Kerin, lawyer, engineer and nominee for VT-AL in 2000
Bill Meub, lawyer and candidate for Governor of Vermont in 2000
Greg Parke, retired United States Air Force lieutenant colonel

Endorsements

Results

Progressive primary

General election
Meub was considered a moderate Republican, portraying himself as pro-choice and pro-business, and attacking incumbent representative Sanders for being a democratic socialist. Sanders nonetheless easily won re-election.

Endorsements

Results

References

2002
Vermont
2002 Vermont elections
Bernie Sanders